Come On Over is the seventh studio album by British-Australian singer Olivia Newton-John, released on 29 February 1976. The album peaked at number two on the US Top Country Albums chart and number 13 on the US Billboard 200.

The lead single released from the album was the title song, written by Barry Gibb and Robin Gibb and originally featured on the Bee Gees' 1975 album Main Course. It was a moderate pop hit, peaking at number 23 on the US Billboard Hot 100, but did much better on the country (number 5) and adult contemporary (seventh of ten number 1 singles) charts. In New Zealand, the title track reached number 3.

The album's first track, a cover of Dolly Parton's "Jolene", was only released as a single in Japan, and it became a hit there, peaking at number 11 on the Oricon Singles Chart. The album itself was also a success in the Japanese market, reaching the number two position on the Oricon Albums Chart. It was released in Australia in 1978 where it peaked at number 29.

The album also included versions of the traditional song "Greensleeves" and The Beatles' "The Long and Winding Road" (the ending track), as well as "Who Are You Now?", originally featured in the 1973 movie Hurry Up, or I'll Be 30. Besides Parton's "Jolene" the album also boasts covers of recent country hits by Willie Nelson ("Blue Eyes Crying in the Rain") and Lynn Anderson ("Smile For Me").

Reception
Cash Box magazine said "The constantly maturing vocals of Olivia Newton-John continue their musical growth on Come On Over. Ms. Newton-John puts effective emotion into every song and when played off against clear instrumentals, strikes an effective tone on ballad and uptempo numbers alike."

Track listing

Personnel

Musicians
 Olivia Newton-John – lead vocals, arrangements (5)
 Steve Gray – keyboards, orchestra arrangements and conductor 
 Graham Todd – keyboards
 John Farrar – acoustic guitar, electric guitars, backing vocals
 Alan Parker – acoustic guitar
 B.J. Cole – steel guitar
 Les Hurdle – bass 
 Alan Tarney – bass 
 Brian Bennett – drums
 David Katz – orchestra contractor
 Vicki Brown – backing vocals
 Pat Farrar – backing vocals
 Clare Torry – backing vocals
 The Queen Singers – vocal group (5)

Production
 Producer – John Farrar
 Engineers – Tony Clark, John Kurlander, Allan Rouse and Michael Stavroes
 Recorded at Abbey Road Studios (London, England)
 Mixed at AIR Studios (London, England)
 Tape Operator – John Walls
 Photography – Jeff Dunas
 Art direction and design – George Osaki

Charts

Weekly charts

Year-end charts

Certifications and sales

References

1976 albums
Olivia Newton-John albums
Albums produced by John Farrar
MCA Records albums